Billmon was the pseudonym of an allegedly  American blogger, who provided his own analysis and commentary on political topics, and who was mainly active in the early 2000s when he published material critical of the US Invasion of Iraq. His blog was called Whiskey Bar.

Career as a blogger

Billmon was one of the earliest participants at DailyKos.  His own blog, Whiskey Bar, came into being in the aftermath of the American invasion of Iraq in the spring of 2003.  The actual name of the blog Whiskey Bar is taken from a line from Bertolt Brecht's "Alabama Song," quoted at the top of the blog.

He wrote extended pieces on domestic politics, the Iraq war, and the US economy. 

At the end of June 2004 Billmon  announced that he would be closing them down.

Billmon continued posting his analysis and comments, with some periods of inactivity, over the following two and a half years.

On December 28, 2006, Billmon stopped blogging at The Whiskey Bar,  and the URL www.billmon.org became unavailable.  In late April 2007, a more or less complete copy of Whiskey Bar re-surfaced, but was down again by October 2007.  On July 31, 2008, Billmon returned to Daily Kos to post a diary entry in regard to John McCain's presidential campaign entitled "The Great White Hope," and has posted sporadically on DailyKos since then., also maintaining a Twitter account.

Another blog now serves as base for Billmon's followers: Moon of Alabama.

References

External links
 The Whiskey Bar (inactive) https://web.archive.org/web/20060413093141/http://www.billmon.org/ (archived)
 Billmon's Diary at Daily Kos

American bloggers
Living people
Year of birth missing (living people)